John Talaia was patriarch of Alexandria from 481 until 482.

He was consecrated in 481, succeeding Timothy III Salophakiolos.

He was a convinced adherent of the Council of Chalcedon and refused to sign Emperor Zeno's Henoticon (which glossed over the Council of Chalcedon). Because of this, the Emperor expelled him and recognized the Miaphysite claimant Peter Mongus as the legitimate patriarch on the condition that he would sign the Henoticon. Mongus complied and was recognized by the patriarchs of Antioch and Constantinople.

John fled to Rome, where he was welcomed by Pope Simplicius. This pope, or his successor Felix III, refused to recognize Mongus and defended Talaia's rights in two letters to Acacius of Constantinople. As Acacius maintained the Henoticon and communion with Mongus, the pope excommunicated the patriarchs in 484. This Acacian schism lasted until 519.

John eventually relinquished his claim to the see of Alexandria and became bishop of Nola.

References

Sources
 
 

5th-century Patriarchs of Alexandria